My Old Lady may refer to:

 My Old Lady (film), a 2014 British-American film
 "My Old Lady", an episode from season 1 of Scrubs